Jonathan Scarfe (born December 16, 1975) is a Canadian film and television actor.

Early life
He was born in Toronto, Ontario, to actors Alan Scarfe and Sara Botsford. He dropped out of high school at age 15, and at the age of 16 he spent a year working at the Stratford Festival, where he learned about acting.<ref name=scifi>{{cite web|title=It's Miller Time - Interview with Van Helsing'''s Jonathan Scarfe|url=http://scifiandtvtalk.typepad.com/scifiandtvtalk/2016/10/its-miller-time-interview-with-van-helsings-jonathan-scarfe.html|website=SciFiAndTvTalk|access-date=7 May 2017}}</ref>

Career
Television
Scarfe's first major role was on the Canadian teen drama Madison. He appears in a recurring role as Chase Carter, the drug-abusing cousin of John Carter, on the medical-drama series ER. His television guest appearances include the police procedural series NYPD Blue, CSI: Miami, Cold Case; and the drama series The L Word, as well as the supernatural drama series Grimm.

Scarfe portrays Sheldon Kennedy in the biographical drama television film The Sheldon Kennedy Story (1999), which follows the story of Kennedy a former professional ice-hockey player with the Calgary Flames who, after years of self-blame, self-guilt and secrecy, spoke out against his former coach and mentor Graham James and the sexual abuse Kennedy endured. His other television films include the biographical drama television film Burn: The Robert Wraight Story (2003), portraying Jesus in the biographical drama television film Judas (2004)., costarring with Jennifer Finnigan in 2015 television film Angel of Christmas and Alison Sweeney in the Hallmark Channel movie "Love On The Air" 2015.

His most notable television roles are Charlie Sagansky in the legal drama series Raising the Bar (2008–2009), Sydney Snow in the western period drama series Hell on Wheels, Matt McLean on the family drama, Ties That Bind and Axel on the Syfy drama Van Helsing.

Film
He appears as protagonist Nicholas Brady in the science-fiction film Radio Free Albemuth (2009), directed by John Alan Simon and based on the novel of the same name (1985) by Philip K. Dick. Scarfe appears as Mormon prophet Joseph Smith in the historical-fiction drama film The Work and the Glory (2004). Scarfe also appears in 100 Days in the Jungle (2002), and White Lies'' (1998).

Personal life
He is married to actress Suki Kaiser. At one point Scarfe took a break from acting and spent two and half years sailing around the world with his family.

Filmography

Film

Television

See also

 List of Canadian actors
 List of people from Toronto

References

External links
 

1975 births
20th-century Canadian male actors
21st-century Canadian male actors
Canadian male film actors
Canadian male television actors
Canadian people of English descent
Living people
Male actors from Toronto
Best Supporting Actor in a Television Film or Miniseries Canadian Screen Award winners